Gerrit Van Roekel (June 11, 1899 – September 17, 1985) was an American politician who served in the Iowa House of Representatives from the 26th district from 1967 to 1971.

He died on September 17, 1985, in Pella, Iowa at age 86.

References

1899 births
1985 deaths
Republican Party members of the Iowa House of Representatives